The Ministry of Foreign Affairs of Mongolia (MOFA) (Mongolian: Монгол улсын Гадаад харилцааны яам) is the Mongolian government ministry which oversees the foreign relations of Mongolia and crafts the country's foreign policy.

Departments
 Department of Policy Planning
 Department of Neighboring States
 Department of Europe
 Department of Asia and the Pacific
 Department of America, Middle East and Africa
 Department of Multilateral Cooperation
 Department of Foreign Trade and Economic Cooperation
 Department of State Administration
 Department of International Law and Treaty
 Department of Consular Affairs
 Department of Public Diplomacy and Cultural Relations
 Protocol Department
 Department of Monitoring, Evaluation and Internal Audit

List of ministers
This is a list of foreign ministers of Mongolia to the present day.

1911–1913: Mijiddorjiin Khanddorj
1913–1915: Balingiin Tserendorj
1915–1919: Gonchigjalzangiin Badamdorj
1921–1922: Dogsomyn Bodoo
1922–1923: Balingiin Tserendorj
1923–1924: Anandyn Amar
1924–1925: Khanjiyn Givaabaljir
1925–1929: Vaanchingiyn Dorligjav
1929–1930: 
1930–1932: Khorloogiin Choibalsan
1932–1936: Peljidiin Genden
1936–1939: Anandyn Amar
1939–1950: Khorloogiin Choibalsan
1950–1953: Nantayshiriyn Lkhamsüren
1953–1955: Bayaryn Jargalsaikhan
1955–1956: Sandavyn Ravdan 
1956–1957: Dashiyn Adilbish
1957–1958: Sonomyn Avarzed
1958–1963: Puntsagiyn Shagdarsüren 
1963–1968: 
1968–1970: Luvsandorjiyn Toiv
1970............ Daramyn Yondon 
1970–1976: 
1976–1988: Mangalyn Dügersüren
1988–1996: 
1996............ Mendsaikhany Enkhsaikhan
1996–1998: Shukher Altangerel
1998............ Rinchinnyamyn Amarjargal
1998–2000: Nyam-Osoryn Tuyaa
2000–2004: Luvsangiin Erdenechuluun
2004–2006: Tsendiin Mönkh-Orgil
2006–2007: Nyamaagiin Enkhbold
2007–2008: 
2008–2009: Sükhbaataryn Batbold
2009–2012: Gombojavyn Zandanshatar
2012–2014: 
2014–2016: 
2016–2017: Tsendiin Mönkh-Orgil
2017–2020: Damdiny Tsogtbaatar
2020–2021: Nyamtseren Enkhtaivan
2021–present: Battsetseg Batmunkh

References

Sources

Rulers.org – Foreign ministers L–R

Foreign
Foreign Ministers
Politicians
Mongolia